Padua (minor planet designation: 363 Padua) is a main belt asteroid that was discovered by Auguste Charlois on 17 March 1893 in Nice. It was named after the city of Padua, near Venice, Italy.

Richard P. Binzel and Schelte Bus further added to the knowledge about this asteroid in a lightwave survey published in 2003. This project was known as Small Main-belt Asteroid Spectroscopic Survey, Phase II  or SMASSII, which built on a previous survey of the main-belt asteroids. The visible-wavelength (0.435-0.925 micrometre) spectra data was gathered between August 1993 and March 1999.

Lightcurve data has also been recorded by observers at the Antelope Hill Observatory, which has been designated as an official observatory by the Minor Planet Center.

References

External links
 Lightcurve plot of (363) Padua, Antelope Hills Observatory
 
 

000363
Discoveries by Auguste Charlois
Named minor planets
000363
000363
18930317